Crossfire refers to the of death of a person by gun shot, oftentimes under the custody of a law enforcement agency in Bangladesh. There are accusations that it is staged extra-judicial killing. In March 2010, the then director general of the elite law enforcement agency of Bangladesh, Rapid Action Battalion (RAB) said that since it was started in 2004 RAB had killed 622 people. Human Rights Watch, a New York-based NGO, has described RAB as a Bangladeshi government death squad. Odhikar, a Dhaka-based human rights organization, reported at least 1,169 people lost their lives in extrajudicial killings between January 2009 and May 2016 in Bangladesh. According to Odhikar, in June 2016, extrajudicial killings in the country took at least 24 lives. According to another rights group, Ain O Salish Kendra, 79 people were killed in so-called shootouts while in police custody in Bangladesh in the first six months of 2016. The police were involved in 37 of these deaths. Of them, seven had been in killed in crossfire with Detective Branch (DB) officials. Bangladesh police forces shot dead 130 people in a Philippines-style drugs crackdown in three weeks starting from May 2018.

Nature 
Bangladesh Government claims that incidents of crossfire deaths are the result of law enforcement officers acting in self-defence. The narrative of the Government comes in either of the following 2 forms: (1) the deceased was caught in crossfire that erupted after miscreants had started shooting at the police, (2) after being challenged by a patrolling police team, few suspected armed persons on motor bikes opened fire; deceased died in the gunfight and few others fled. However, rights group have been refusing to believe the police version of the crossfire incidents. They have long accused Bangladesh's security forces, especially the elite law enforcement agency Rapid Action Battalion, of arbitrarily picking up people, torturing them, and then killing them in custody. When suspects are shown to journalists, they often wear a bulletproof vest. But, while taking them to raids to arrest their accomplices, the criminals are routinely without any such vest. Media usually reports these incidents as crossfire within quotation marks.

Events 
 Mukul Rana: According to Detective Branch of Bangladesh Police, on Jun 2016, after being challenged by a patrolling police team, three suspected militants on motor bikes opened fire; Shariful died in the gunfight and two militants fled. Father of the deceased claimed he is Mukul Rana and had disappeared after being picked up by plainclothes police in February same year.
 Golam Faizullah Fahim: Aged 19, accused of critically injuring a Hindu teacher in a machete attack, was killed in a gunfight on June 18, 2016. According to police, some militants fired upon them from a hideout, while he was accompanying police on a raid.
 Zafar Alam, Jahangir Alam, and Dhalu Hossain: According to Bangladeshi police, these are three notorious human traffickers who had been killed on May 8, 2015 during a gunfight with officers. However, there are accusation that one or two days prior to each of the incidents, the police picked up the men from their homes or from local markets.
 Lutfar and Khairul Khalashi: were arrested by the Rapid Action Battalion (RAB), on November 13, 2009. The following day family members organized a press briefing in which they urged the authorities to ensure that the brothers would not be killed because of RAB's long record of killing people in custody. But on November 16, 2009, RAB announced that both had been killed in crossfire, with a RAB patrol team early the same morning. When the High Court of Bangladesh issued a ruling the next day directing the authorities to explain the deaths, the law officer at RAB headquarters denied that any shoot-out had occurred at all, contradicting its previous announcement.
 Rasal Ahmed Bhutto: He was picked up by RAB personnel in plainclothes on March 3, 2011, while minding a friend's shop in Dhaka. On March 10, Bhutto was brought to the area where he lived, in a RAB vehicle. He was shot inside the park. Later RAB summoned journalists to show the body of an alleged criminal killed in crossfire.
 Akramul Haque: Rapid Action Battalion (RAB) claimed it had killed 46 years old Akramul Haque in a gunfight between drug dealers and the elite force in Teknaf around 1:00am on 27 May 2018. It accused him of being a drug dealer and claimed to have found two guns and thousands of methamphetamine pills on his body. However, few days later, Akram's family distributed four recorded mobile phone conversations between Akram and his daughter and wife before he died from bullet wound. The recorded audio also captured sounds of gunfire and groans of the dying man.

Crossfire threats 
Detective Branch of Bangladesh has been accused of threatening abducted or captured people with cross fire to get confessional statement from them to magistrates.

In photography 
Photographer Shahidul Alam organized an art exhibition named as 'Crossfire' with a series of large images evocative of the places where the victims were murdered or discovered.

See also 
 Encounter killings by police
 Forced disappearances in Bangladesh
 Bangladesh Drug War
 Human rights in Bangladesh

References 

Human rights in Bangladesh